Jamal Miles (born February 28, 1991) is an American football wide receiver for the Arizona Rattlers of the Indoor Football League (IFL). Miles played college football for Arizona State University. He was undrafted in the 2013 NFL Draft and signed as an undrafted free agent by the Jacksonville Jaguars.

Early years
Miles attended Peoria High School, where he was selected to the first-team All-4A conference as a senior after rushing for 2,168 yards on 231 carries. He was rated a 4-star prospect and number 6 in the state of Arizona by Rivals.com.

College career
Miles was used primarily as a return specialist throughout college and became one of Arizona State's most prolific return men. He was also a contributor both in the backfield and as a receiver. He had 10 career receiving touchdowns, 2 rushing touchdowns, 1 passing touchdown and 4 return touchdowns.

Statistics
Source:

Professional career
On April 28, 2013, Miles was added as an undrafted free agent by the Jacksonville Jaguars to their training camp roster. On August 19, 2013, Miles was waived by the Jaguars. After being released, Miles signed with the Edmonton Eskimos on September 4, 2013.

On January 17, 2017, Miles was signed by the Arizona Rattlers of the Indoor Football League. On July 8, the Rattlers defeated the Sioux Falls Storm in the United Bowl by a score of 50–41.

References

External links
 Arizona State profile
 Jacksonville Jaguars profile
 Edmonton Eskimos profile

1991 births
Living people
People from Peoria, Arizona
Sportspeople from the Phoenix metropolitan area
Players of American football from Arizona
American football return specialists
American football wide receivers
Arizona State Sun Devils football players
Jacksonville Jaguars players
Arizona Rattlers players
American players of Canadian football
African-American players of American football
Canadian football wide receivers
Edmonton Elks players
21st-century African-American sportspeople